This is a list of members of the Western Australian Legislative Council from 22 May 1926 to 21 May 1928. The chamber had 30 seats made up of ten provinces each electing three members, on a system of rotation whereby one-third of the members would retire at each biennial election.

Notes
 On 2 January 1928, South Province Nationalist MLC Jabez Dodd died. Nationalist candidate George Rainsford won the resulting by-election on 11 February 1928—however, he was not sworn in and did not take his seat, and was defeated at the Council elections three months later.

Sources
 
 
 

Members of Western Australian parliaments by term